Destroy What Destroys You is an album by the American ska-punk band Against All Authority. It was recorded by the band in May 1995 without any affiliation to a label or studio. It was released in 1996 by Far Out Records. The original album contained 18 songs. it was expanded for the CD and cassette release to include four songs from the band's first 7" release, "Above the Law".

Track listing 
  "Lifestyle of Rebellion" – 1:51
  "No Reason" – 2:19
  "Conditioning" – 2:09
  "Freedom" – 1:57
  "Destroy What Destroys You" – 1:47
  "It Really Sucks When..." – 1:33
  "Bloodclot" – 1:35
  "Another Fuck You Song" – 2:08
  "No Government Can Give You Freedom" – 0:35 (mistitled as 30 Sec Song)
  "Kickin' the Dog" – 1:36
  "Sounds of the Underground" – 1:45
  "Osuchowski's on the Loose" – 2:06
  "Walking Revolution" – 2:33
  "Disobey" – 1:36
  "Chelsea Baby" – 1:53
  "Corporate Takeover" – 1:58
  "Hard as Fuck" – 2:13
  "Centerfold" – 1:54
  "We Won't Submit" – 2:27 (CD & cassette only)
  "Above the Law" – 2:51 (CD & cassette only)
  "Under Your Authority" – 2:42 (CD & cassette only)
  "Court 22" – 2:17 (CD & cassette only)

Personnel 
 Danny Lore (bass guitar, lead vocals)
 Joe Koontz (guitar, backing vocals)
 Kris King (drums)
 Tim Farout (trombone)
 Joey Jukes (trumpet)
 Tim Coats (saxophone)

Crew 
 Omar Angulo (artwork)
 Greg Lee (mastering)

1995 debut albums
Against All Authority albums